The Canon EOS 100 is a 35 mm autofocus SLR camera introduced by Canon in 1991. It was marketed as the EOS Elan in North America. It was the second camera in the EOS range to be targeted at advanced amateur photographers, replacing the EOS 650.

Its headline features were near-silent film winding, input of EOS barcode programs, integral auto-zoom flash, twin input dials, an autofocus auxiliary light for low-contrast subjects, a maximum shutter speed of 1/4000s,  and five fully automatic modes.

Design

The look and feel of the EOS 100 had much in common with the T90 and EOS 650. It was based around a polycarbonate body with metal bayonet lens mount.

The top left of the body had a Command Dial for choice of either Creative or Image zones and buttons to control the integral flash. The top right of the body had a multi-function Main Dial, buttons for autofocus and film advance control, the shutter release button and an LCD display panel. The back of the body had the Quick Control Dial, used for aperture control, and the AE Lock Button, used to lock exposure settings.

Once the Command Dial had been set for a particular shooting style, all controls could be accessed with the right hand, with the viewfinder feeding back information to the photographer.

Power features

The EOS 100 came with a motorised belt drive for film winding and rewinding. Canon claimed this made it the quietest camera in the EOS range.

The drive also enabled the camera to operate at three frames per second, faster than most of its competitors.

Using the Drive Button, the photographer could choose whether to allow single or multiple photographs to be taken as the shutter release button was held.

The drive could also be disabled to allow up to nine multiple exposures to be made.

All powered functions in the EOS 100 came from a single 6 volt lithium 2CR5. There was no option to adapt this to AA size batteries.

Focusing

The EOS 100 had a single BASIS (BAse Stored Image Sensor) chip, targeting the centre of the viewfinder. This was key to its two autofocussing (AF) modes: One-shot AF and AI Servo AF.

One-shot AF was used for stationary objects. Once in focus, exposure was calculated then the shutter was released. In low light or low contrast situations, the AF auxiliary light would momentarily project a series of red bands on the subject. This then enabled the AF circuits to have a subject with contrast they could focus onto.

AI Servo AF was used for moving objects. The lens would continuously refocus on the object in the centre of the viewfinder whilst the shutter release button was pressed half-way. Once the shutter release button was fully pressed, the exposure was calculated then the shutter released.

Depth of field preview could be enabled via a custom function. If enabled, the aperture would reduce to show the depth of field every time the AE Lock Button was pressed.

Exposure control

Light metering consisted of full-aperture through-the-lens metering, using a six zone silicon photocell. Automatic exposure settings were calculated using three metering modes: partial metering (central 6.5% of the picture), centre-weighted average metering and evaluative metering. The current metering mode was displayed on the LCD panel.

The Command Dial gave the photographer the choice of several shooting modes. The operation, and even the symbology used, would eventually be incorporated into Canon's digital camera range. Canon's fully automatic Programmed Image Control modes were Full Auto, Portrait, Landscape, Close-up and Sports.

The manually adjustable shooting modes were Shutter-priority, Aperture-priority and Depth-of-field. In these modes, the exposure could be compensated by ±2 stops in 1/2-stop increments. Also, AEB (auto exposure bracketing) could be used to take three continuous exposures in sequence, again by ±2 stops in 1/2-stop increments.

All exposure control settings would be ignored when the Command Dial was set to manual. Then, both shutter speed and aperture could be set independently. The viewfinder would still give information on whether the camera thought the shot would be under- or over-exposed, but it wouldn't interfere.

Flash

The EOS 100 had an integrated retractable TTL flash. Information via the EF lens mount was used to optimise the zoom setting of the flash. It had three zooms to cover the focal lengths of 28 mm, 50 mm and 80 mm. Consequently, its guide number for ISO 100 varied between 12 m at 28 mm, to 18 m at 80 mm.

The focal plane shutter gave an X-sync speed of 1/125 second. The flash would normally fire when the first curtain had finished its travel, but this could be changed to the second curtain via a custom function.

Red-eye reduction was achieved by producing a piercing continuous bright light to the left of the flash. This would shine while the flash capacitors were charged.

The flash shoe contained signals for X-sync, red-eye reduction and second curtain sync.

Accessories

The only accessory specific to the EOS 100 made by Canon was the GR-70 grip extension. However, unlike other grip extensions, this provides neither further power solutions (e.g. via AA batteries), nor extra shutter release buttons (e.g. for shooting in vertical, portrait orientation).

The EOS 100 had a feature it shared with just one other camera (the EOS 10) in the EOS range; the barcode reader. With the Command Dial turned to the barcode setting, the camera would accept programming details from Canon's Barcode Reader. Canon published a book of approximately 100 photographs showing different styles of pictures (landscapes, night-time shots, fast moving action, etc.). Below each was a barcode which could be scanned by the reader. This reader was then placed against the camera's infrared connection point and the settings were transferred.

The back could not be exchanged, e.g. for date/time stamping. For this functionality, Canon released the EOS 100QD, where QD stood for Quartz Date. Contrary to Canon's own publications, this was marketed worldwide, not just in Japan.

Despite not having many specific accessories, the EOS 100 was built to accept all of Canon's EOS range of accessories:

 all EF lenses
 Speedlite 430EZ flash (guide number 43 m)
 Speedlite 300EZ flash (guide number 28 m)
 ML-3 ring flash
 RC-1 infrared remote control unit
 Dioptric adjustment lenses for the viewfinder eye piece

Custom functions

The EOS 100 was among the first of Canon's cameras to have the facility to alter its operation via custom functions. These would remain set even if the camera was switched off or the battery replaced.

Use today

The EOS 100 never enjoyed the popularity of the lower-pitched EOS 1000 and it was discontinued in 1995.

As of 2008, EOS 100 bodies can be bought from on-line auction sites from as little as £10/$15.

Along with the T90, and other older Canon SLR film cameras, used EOS 100s can suffer from a 'sticky shutter' problem. This is caused by the camera's internal light sealing foam, which degrades over time and becomes stuck to the shutter, affecting exposures. This can affect the camera's resale value. The command dial is also prone to detachment from the electronic part of the dial, and many used EOS 100s are rendered unusable from this manufacturing flaw.

References
Canon Inc (1991). "Canon EOS 100 Instructions, English Edition", PUB.C-IE-160G

External links

100